Ambrus Lele (born August 19, 1958, in Szeged) is a former Hungarian handball player who competed in the 1980 Summer Olympics.

In 1980 he was part of the Hungarian team which finished fourth in the Olympic tournament. He played four matches and scored five goals.

References

External links 
 
 
 

1958 births
Living people
Hungarian male handball players
Olympic handball players of Hungary
Handball players at the 1980 Summer Olympics
Sportspeople from Szeged